The "Big Four" were a quartet of early-20th-century 20,000-ton ocean liners built by the Harland & Wolff shipyard for the White Star Line, to be the largest and most luxurious ships afloat.

Origin
After Thomas Ismay's death, the order of Oceanics sister-ship,  was cancelled. Instead, resources were transferred to the company's new project; to build the grandest fleet of ships that had ever sailed the seas, the "Big Four".

History 
In 1901, the White Star Line ordered a series of four ships that were to be larger than Great Eastern, terming these ships the "Big Four". The four ships were designed to have a tonnage in excess of 20,000 tons and rather than being built for speed and to compete for the Blue Riband, were designed to be more luxurious than their rivals.

She was shorter than Oceanic but was still longer than Great Eastern.

At the time she was launched she was the biggest moving object ever built at 21,035 gross register tons.

She was the largest ship in the world at 23,876 gross register tons until 1905, when the HAPAG's 24,581 gross register ton  surpassed her in tonnage.

Lastly the Red Star Line's , at a more economical 17,000 tons, was a virtual sister ship to the "Big Four" in her layout and dimensions. Lapland was also built by Harland & Wolff.

Features 

The "Big Four" had a tonnage of 21,000-to-24,500 tons, with Baltic and Adriatic much larger than the first two. However, Adriatic, which was the largest of the four, was also the only one not to have held the title of largest passenger ship in world.

The silhouettes of the four vessels were similar, black hull with red keel and white superstructure, with an "island" bridge separated from the rest of the superstructure. They were provided with four masts (two front and two rear) which supported the cables of wireless telegraphy. The two funnels were buff topped with a black sleeve.

The vessels had luxury on an unprecedented scale, with a dining room dominated by a glass roof, a lounge with a reading and writing room with many books and periodicals, also adorned with large picture windows, a covered promenade deck, a smoking room decorated stained glass and in the case of Adriatic, an indoor pool and Turkish baths.

Ships' careers

Celtic 
 was the first of the "Big Four", entering service in 1901. She was the first ship to exceed the Great Eastern in tonnage. Her career was marred by several accidents. Transformed into an auxiliary cruiser during the First World War, she struck a mine in 1917, killing 17 people. In 1918, she was torpedoed by a German submarine, but was once again remained afloat. In 1925, she was in collision with another vessel, but neither ship suffered serious damage. She was involved in another collision in 1927. Finally, in 1928, she struck rocks off Cobh and was considered unrecoverable. It took five years for the ship to be completely dismantled.

Cedric 
 entered service in 1903. Her commercial career was divided into transatlantic crossings and cruises. When the  sank, Cedric was docked in New York. After the sinking it was reported that J. Bruce Ismay, managing director of the White Star line, had attempted to arrange, by wireless with the White Star New York offices, to delay the sailing of Cedric until  arrived in port so that he and the surviving crew members of Titanic could return to England without setting foot in the United States. However Cedric sailed on schedule. During the First World War, Cedric was transformed into an auxiliary cruiser. On  she collided with the Canadian Pacific ship Montreal off Morecambe Bay. Montreal was taken in tow but sank the next day  from the Mersey Bar lightvessel. Neither vessel was seriously damaged. She was decommissioned in 1931 and was scrapped the following year.

Baltic 

On 15 April 1912, Baltic received the distress call from Titanic, but was unable to assist. On 17 February 1933, she sailed for Osaka where she was scrapped. Baltic was commonly accompanied by White Star tender SS Magnetic, which serviced her throughout most of her career. The two ships appear together on many White Star Line postcards.

Adriatic 
 entered service in 1907. She was the largest, the fastest, and the most luxurious of the Big Four, being the first ocean liner to have an indoor swimming pool and a Turkish bath. Her career was marked by the events known by her sister ships, and she enjoyed a successful commercial career, even having the honor of opening the Southampton – New York route for the White Star Line. Her career was interrupted by the First World War, during which the ship made several voyages as a troop transport. Adriatic was devoted full-time to cruising from 1933, and was retired the following year. She was scrapped in Japan in 1935.

Footnotes

Bibliography 

 

Ships of the White Star Line
Ocean liner classes
Ships built in Belfast
Ships built by Harland and Wolff